Lisa Foruzan Tønne (Persian: فروزان) (born 21 December 1977) is an Iranian-Norwegian stand-up comedian and actress.

In 2002 she won the Best New Artist award at the Norwegian Comedy Awards. She has also been an actor and presenter on television, and from 2004 to 2007 played the part of "Solfrid" in the situation comedy Seks som oss. She was a judge on Series 6 of Norske_Talenter.

Tønne married the television presenter Kyrre Holm Johannessen in 2007, and in December 2008 she had her first child, a boy.

References

External links
Home page

1977 births
Living people
Norwegian television actresses
People from Trondheim
Iranian emigrants to Norway
Norwegian women comedians
Norwegian stand-up comedians